Anna Haverinen (née Fonsell; 6 August 1884, Somero - 16 December 1959) was a Finnish office worker and politician. She was a member of the Parliament of Finland from 1922 to 1930, representing the Social Democratic Party of Finland (SDP).

References

1884 births
1959 deaths
People from Somero
People from Häme Province (Grand Duchy of Finland)
Social Democratic Party of Finland politicians
Members of the Parliament of Finland (1922–24)
Members of the Parliament of Finland (1924–27)
Members of the Parliament of Finland (1927–29)
Members of the Parliament of Finland (1929–30)
20th-century Finnish women politicians
Women members of the Parliament of Finland